Tatsuhiko Ito (伊藤達彦, Itō Tatsuhiko, born 23 March 1998) is a Japanese long-distance runner.

On 4 December 2020, he finished second to Akira Aizawa in the 10,000m race at the Japanese national championships in a time of 27:25.73 at the Nagai Stadium, Osaka. In doing so, he broke the old Japanese national record along with Akira Aizawa and ran the Olympic qualifying standard time to secure a place at his home 2020 Tokyo Olympics.

Personal bests
Outdoor
5000 metres – 13:33.97 (Chitose 2020)
10000 metres – 27:25.73 (Osaka 2020)
10 miles – 46:31 (Karatsu 2019)
Half marathon – 1:01:52 (Tachikawa 2019)

References

1998 births
Living people
Japanese male long-distance runners
People from Hamamatsu
Universiade bronze medalists for Japan
Medalists at the 2019 Summer Universiade
Olympic athletes of Japan
Athletes (track and field) at the 2020 Summer Olympics
Universiade medalists in athletics (track and field)
21st-century Japanese people